Valvata bicarinata, common name the two-ridge valvata, is a species of small freshwater snail with a gill and an operculum, an aquatic gastropod mollusk in the family Valvatidae, the valve snails.

References

External links 
 http://www.cofc.edu/~fwgna/species/valvatidae/v_bicarinata.html

Valvatidae
Gastropods described in 1841
Taxobox binomials not recognized by IUCN